"Never Would Have Made It" is a single by  American gospel singer Marvin Sapp from his seventh studio album Thirsty. Sapp wrote this song as a tribute after the death of his father, Henry Lewis Sapp, Jr. He testifies that it was created by divine inspiration the Sunday after his father’s burial.

Music video
The 2008 music video features Sapp, and a cast of actors in interjecting scenes. Throughout the video, the scenes interchange and a revisited over the scenes plot development.  The primary scene is Sapp in an auditorium; this scene moves from the stage to a balcony. The first of the interchanging scenes is shot in 16th Street Baptist Church, a church known for a Civil Rights Era bombing; over the course of exchanges the scene develops to show a pastor preaching from the pulpit. The second scene features a cast of three young women mourning at a graveside. The third scene features a mother and child in a car, presumably jobless and lacking resources to provide for her child. The original music video shows the live recording.

Chart performance
The song is Sapp's biggest success so far on American music charts. The song peaked at #82 on the Billboard Hot 100 chart in the U.S. It also topped the Billboard Hot Gospel Songs chart and reached the top twenty on the Billboard Hot R&B/Hip-Hop Songs listing. The song topped the gospel chart for 46 weeks. The song was also certified platinum by the RIAA.

Charts

Weekly charts

Year-end charts

References

External links
Artist Profile WLIB website

2007 singles
Gospel songs
2007 songs